German Studies Review is a peer-reviewed academic journal and an official publication of the German Studies Association that is published triannually. It was established in 1978 and publishes articles on the history, literature, culture, and politics of German-speaking Europe.

According to the Journal Citation Reports, the journal has a 2016 impact factor of 0.413.

References

External links

Area studies journals
Triannual journals
Publications established in 1978
English-language journals